Copp Motorsports was an American professional stock car racing team that competed in the NASCAR Gander Outdoors Truck Series. The team was owned by D. J. Copp. The team fielded the No. 63 Chevrolet Silverado part-time for Bobby Gerhart, Timmy Hill and Scott Stenzel. Copp purchased the assets of Contreras Motorsports in early 2017 to make the team.

History
During the early part of 2017, D. J. Copp bought the assets of the race team an acquaintance of his, Carlos Contreras, owned. Copp renumbered the trucks from the Contreras No. 71 to the traditional Copp family number, No. 83. In the beginning of the 2017 season, Copp and his wife were the only two full-time employees of the team.

On August 6, 2019, Copp announced that the future of the team is uncertain, commenting that "some people make it hard to love the sanctioning body."

Gander Outdoors Truck Series

Truck No. 36 history
To complete the 32-truck field, Copp Motorsports field a second truck No. 36 in partnership with MB Motorsports for Camden Murphy at Kansas. The truck returned at Dover with J. J. Yeley behind the wheel.

Truck No. 63 history
In 2019, the team decided to run the No. 63 for the whole season in memory of Mike Mittler, who died on May 10, 2019.

Truck No. 83 history

In 2017 D. J. Copp, a former dirt racer-turned-tire changer and crew chief, bought Contreras Motorsports and renumbered the No. 71 to the No. 83. Copp's family racing history was the driving force behind changing the number to 83. They made their first start with Todd Peck driving at Daytona International Speedway in the NextEra Energy Resources 250. In their first start, they finished 18th. Peck stayed with the team for the next race, but retired early with overheating issues. Donnie Levister then made his first Camping World Truck Series race with the team at martinsville, but again the truck fell victim to mechanical issues. Due to lack of sponsorship, the team started and parked in most of the races.

On March 15, 2017, it was announced that former drag racer Salvatore Iovino would pilot the Copp Motorsports entry full-time in 2018, though the truck number may not be 83, however, the deal fell through and Scott Stenzel, Bayley Currey, and Kyle Donahue now drive the 83.

Partnerships
Early in the 2017 NASCAR Camping World Truck Series season, Copp formed a partnership with MB Motorsports, fielding the No. 36 for Camden Murphy with MB owner Mike Mittler as crew chief. The following week, Murphy was shuffled out of MB's No. 63 at Charlotte to make room for Todd Peck, who ran what appeared to be the Daytona truck renumbered to 63 and still under the MB banner in owner points.

References

External links
 Facebook Page

Stock car racing
American auto racing teams
Defunct NASCAR teams
2017 establishments in North Carolina